West Side Jewish Center may refer to:

 Jewish Center (Manhattan), an Orthodox synagogue on West 86th Street on Manhattan's Upper West Side
 Congregation Beth Israel West Side Jewish Center, an Orthodox synagogue on West 34th Street in Manhattan's Garment District

See also
 Jewish Center (disambiguation)
 New West End Synagogue